Club Deportivo Ronda is a Spanish football team based in Ronda, Province of Málaga, in the autonomous community of Andalusia. Founded in 1931, it plays in Tercera División – Group 9, holding home matches at Ciudad Deportiva, with a 2,000-seat capacity.

Season to season

1 season in Segunda División B
26 seasons in Tercera División

Former players
 Kelvin Onosiughe
 Ángel Guirado
 Iván Peñaranda

Former coaches
 Enrique Mateos

References

External links
Comprehensive tourist information about Ronda in English
Official website 
Futbolme team profile 

Football clubs in Andalusia
Association football clubs established in 1931
1931 establishments in Spain